Rulers and Signatories of the Fante Confederation

(Dates in italics indicate de facto continuation of office)

See also 
Akan people
Ghana
Gold Coast
Lists of incumbents

Rulers